Orthosphenia is a monotypic genus of flowering plants belonging to the family Celastraceae. The only species is Orthosphenia mexicana.

Its native range is Northeastern Mexico.

References

Celastraceae
Celastrales genera
Monotypic rosid genera